Alfred Peter Standridge (April 25, 1891 – August 2, 1963) was a pitcher in Major League Baseball. He played for the St. Louis Cardinals and Chicago Cubs. He was later the player/manager of the Edmonton Eskimos in the Western Canada League in 1920.

References

External links

1891 births
1963 deaths
Major League Baseball pitchers
St. Louis Cardinals players
Chicago Cubs players
Baseball players from Washington (state)
Minor league baseball managers
Seattle Siwashes players
Calgary Bronchos players
Vallejo Marines players
Watsonville Pippins players
San Francisco Seals (baseball) players
Los Angeles Angels (minor league) players
Edmonton Eskimos (baseball) players
People from King County, Washington